Kennedy Bridge is a historic wooden covered bridge located in East Vincent Township, Chester County, Pennsylvania. It was damaged and repaired after a flood in 1884 and reinforced in 1936. It crosses French Creek.

It was listed on the National Register of Historic Places in 1974.

References 

Covered bridges on the National Register of Historic Places in Pennsylvania
Covered bridges in Chester County, Pennsylvania
Bridges completed in 1856
Wooden bridges in Pennsylvania
Bridges in Chester County, Pennsylvania
1856 establishments in Pennsylvania
National Register of Historic Places in Chester County, Pennsylvania
Road bridges on the National Register of Historic Places in Pennsylvania
Burr Truss bridges in the United States